The commune of Giharo is a commune of Rutana Province in southeastern Burundi. The capital lies at Giharo.

References

Communes of Burundi
Rutana Province